Scarabaeus sacer, common name sacred scarab, is the type species of dung beetles in its genus and the family Scarabaeidae.

Taxonomy
Scarabaeus sacer was described by Carl Linnaeus in his 1758 10th edition of Systema Naturae, the starting point of zoological nomenclature. It is considered the type species of the genus Scarabaeus, despite some controversy surrounding Latreille's 1810 type designation, which was resolved by a ruling of the International Commission on Zoological Nomenclature in 2014, to accept Hope's 1837 designation of S. sacer as the type rather than Latreille's 1810 designation (of Dynastes hercules).

Distribution and habitat
Scarabaeus sacer occurs in coastal dunes and marshes around the Mediterranean Basin. 
It can be found across North Africa, southern Europe and parts of Asia (Afghanistan, Corsica, Cyprus, Egypt, Ethiopia, France, Iran, Israel, Italy, Morocco, Sardinia, Sicily, Spain, Sudan and Syria). In the Camargue, Scarabaeus sacer is almost exclusively a coastal species, living only in dunes and coastal marshes.

Description
The head of Scarabaeus sacer has a distinctive array of six projections, resembling rays. The projections are uniform with four more projections on each of the tibiae of the front legs, creating an arc of fourteen "rays" (see illustration). Functionally the projections are adaptations for digging and for shaping the ball of dung.

Like the front legs of other beetles of its genus, but unlike those of dung beetles in most other genera, the front legs of Scarabaeus sacer are unusual; they do not end in any recognisable tarsus, the foot that bears the claws. There is only a vestigial claw-like structure that might be of some assistance in digging. The mid- and hind-legs of Scarabaeus have normal, well-developed 5-segmented tarsi, but the front legs are specialised for excavation and for forming balls of dung.

Life cycle and ecology
 Among the coprophagous species of beetles, Scarabaeus sacer is typical of those that collect dung into balls. Such a beetle rolls its ball to a suitable location, where it digs an underground chamber in which it hides the ball. It then eats the ball itself, a process that may take several days.

When the female is ready to breed she selects especially fine-textured dung to make her breeding ball, and digs an especially deep and large chamber for it. There she sculpts it into a pear-shape with a hollow cavity in the narrow part. In that cavity she lays a single large egg. She then seals the cavity and departs to repeat the process elsewhere. Typically a successful female Scarabaeus sacer will produce only about half a dozen young in her life. The larva feeds on the ball of dung after the egg hatches.

Scarabaeus sacer serves as the host for the phoretic mite Macrocheles saceri.

Human significance

Scarabaeus sacer is the most famous of the scarab beetles. To the Ancient Egyptians, S. sacer was a symbol of Khepri, the early morning manifestation of the sun god Ra, from an analogy between the beetle's behaviour of rolling a ball of dung across the ground and Khepri's task of rolling the sun across the sky. They accordingly held the species to be sacred.

The Egyptians also observed young beetles emerging from the ball of dung, from which they mistakenly inferred that the male beetle was able to reproduce without needing a female, simply by injecting his sperm into the ball of dung. From this, they drew parallels with their god Atum, who also begat children alone.

Scarabaeus sacer was the species which first piqued the interest of William Sharp Macleay and drew him into a career in entomology.

See also
Scarab in Ancient Egypt
Scarab (artifact)
Commemorative scarabs of Amenhotep III

References

External links

Scarabaeinae
Beetles described in 1758